Vallée du Bandama District is one of fourteen administrative districts of Ivory Coast. The district is located in the north-central part of the country. The capital of the district is Bouaké.

Creation
Vallée du Bandama District was created in a 2011 administrative reorganisation of the subdivisions of Ivory Coast. The territory of the district was composed of the former Vallée du Bandama Region.

Location 
The district is located in the north-central part of the country, it borders from north, going clockwise Savanes District, Zanzan District,

Lacs District, Sassandra-Marahoué District, Woroba District

Administrative divisions
Vallée du Bandama District is currently subdivided into two regions and the following departments:
 Gbêkê Region (region seat also in Bouaké)
 Béoumi Department
 Botro Department
 Bouaké Department
 Sakassou Department
 Hambol Region (region seat in Katiola)
 Dabakala Department
 Katiola Department
 Niakaramandougou Department

Population
According to the 2021 census, Vallée du Bandama District has a population of 1,964,929.

References

 
Districts of Ivory Coast
States and territories established in 2011